Bill W. is a 2012 American biographical film  directed by Dan Carracino and Kevin Hanlon, about William Griffith Wilson, the co-founder of Alcoholics Anonymous, and the first feature length documentary on Wilson.

Synopsis
The film includes interviews with several recovering alcoholics who are photographed in dark shadows to maintain their anonymity, and also makes use of dramatic reenactments to visualize key events in Wilson's life. Blake J. Evans portrays Wilson in the film.

Production
Making a film about the founder of an anonymous society presented the filmmakers with challenges. For example, by the time production began, there were few people still alive that knew Wilson, and it first appeared that there was very little visual material available on Wilson. The filmmakers were able to unearth little-seen archival footage and previously unpublished photographs of Wilson and the people in his life.

Release
The film opened on limited release in New York City and Los Angeles on Friday, May 18, 2012.

Prior to its theatrical release, Bill W. screened at the Cleveland International Film Festival.

PBS version and Emmy Award
An extensively re-edited and extended “director’s cut” version of the film (116 minutes) was aired on PBS starting in September 2016. This version of the film won an Emmy award in 2017.

Recognition

Critical response
Upon its release, the reviews of the film have been favorable. As of May 22, 2012, the film received a 100% positive rating on the Rotten Tomatoes website and a 78 Metascore (with all favorable reviews) on Metacritic. Ernest Hardy in his Village Voice review described the film as "a loving, exhaustive, warts-and-all look at the man who spent years battling his own alcoholism before a spiritual experience in the hospital set him on the course to help others."

Sheri Linden's review in the Los Angeles Times described Bill W. as "a thoroughly engrossing portrait of Wilson, his times and the visionary fellowship that is his legacy."

Roger Ebert gave Bill W. three stars out of four, calling it "an assembly of styles. It incorporates such film footage of Bill as is available, and then uses actors to re-enact chapters in his story."

Partial cast
 Bill Wilson as himself (voice)
 Dr. Bob as himself (voice) 
 Blake J. Evans as Bill Wilson
 Chris Gates as Dr. Bob
 Leila J. Babson as Anne Smith
 Julia Schell as Lois Wilson
 Laura Kauffmann as Martha Deane
 Tim Intravia as Edwin “Ebby T.” Thacher
 Rachel Lynn Jackson as Ruth Hock
 Dennis Lowell as Hank Parkhurst
 Ron Nagle as Bill's Grandfather
 Max Owens as Young Bill Wilson
 Lenore Pershing as Henrietta Seiberling
 Norman Shultz as Father Ed Dowling
 Francis Stallings as Kathleen Parkhurst
 Catherine Hogan as Waitress
 Bill Weeden as Financier

References

External links
Official Site

Bill W. documentary at CIFF (audio segment with partial transcript) from WKSU-FM

2012 films
2012 documentary films
American biographical films
American documentary films
Documentary films about alcoholism
Biographical documentary films
Films shot in Ohio
2010s English-language films
2010s American films